"Sail Across the Water" is a song by the Canadian singer/songwriter Jane Siberry. It is the only single released in support of her sixth album When I Was a Boy, issued in 1993.

Formats and track listing 
All songs written by Jane Siberry.
US CD single (PRO-CD-6259)
"Sail Across the Water" (edit) – 4:12
"Sail Across the Water" (Brian Eno edit) – 5:11

Charts

Personnel
Adapted from the Sail Across the Water liner notes.

 Jane Siberry – vocals, guitar, piano, keyboards, production
Musicians
 Ken Myhr – guitar
 James Pinker – drums

Production and additional personnel
 Michael Brook – production, mixing
 Brian Eno – production, synthesizer

Release history

References

External links 
 Sail Across the Water at Discogs (list of releases)

1993 songs
1993 singles
Jane Siberry songs
Songs written by Jane Siberry
Song recordings produced by Brian Eno
Song recordings produced by Jane Siberry
Reprise Records singles